Ljungaverk was released in 2012, and is the debut studio album from Swedish pop rock band Stiftelsen.

Track listing

Musicians
Robert Pettersson – vocals, guitar
Micke Eriksson - guitar
Arne Johansson - bass
Martin Källström - drums

Charts

Weekly charts

Year-end charts

References

2012 debut albums
Stiftelsen (band) albums
Swedish-language albums
Universal Music Group albums